Charles Jessamine Shields (December 10, 1879 – August 27, 1953) was a Major League Baseball pitcher who played in  and  with the Baltimore Orioles, St. Louis Browns and the St. Louis Cardinals. He batted and threw left-handed.

He was born in Jackson, Tennessee, and died in Memphis, Tennessee.

External links

1879 births
1953 deaths
Major League Baseball pitchers
Baseball players from Tennessee
Baltimore Orioles (1901–02) players
St. Louis Browns players
St. Louis Cardinals players
Memphis Egyptians players
Portland Browns players
Seattle Siwashes players
Altoona Mountaineers players
Nashville Vols players